Iraj Janatie Ataie (also Romanized as "Īraj Jannatī `Atāyī"; born 9 January, 1947 in Mashhad) is a critically and popularly acclaimed Iranian poet, lyricist, playwright and theatre director. He is best known for his collaborations with Ebi, Googoosh, and Dariush.

Janatie Ataie graduated from the Drama School of Tehran University and studied art sociology in Chelsea College of Art and Design.

See also
Shahyar Ghanbari

References

External links 

Iranian dramatists and playwrights
Persian-language poets
1947 births
Living people
20th-century Iranian poets
Iranian lyricists
Exiles of the Iranian Revolution in the United States
21st-century Iranian poets
Iranian emigrants to the United States